Sherpa is a French law association, founded in 2001. Sherpa carries out advocacy, strategic litigation, legal research and capacity building activities, in order to strengthen economic actors’ accountability and build up a legal framework that better protects the environment, communities and human rights.

To implement these activities, Sherpa brings together lawyers, legal experts, academics and many other experts who support its action by putting forward an innovative approach to law. Sherpa has, for example, brought various claims for misleading advertising against the French retailer Auchan and the South Korean conglomerate Samsung.  In both cases, the NGO alleged that the companies did wrongfully claim to be ethical companies.

References

External links
 Sherpa official website (In French)
 2011 Annual Report

Business ethics organizations
Legal organizations based in France